Tarik Oulida (born 19 January 1974) is a Dutch former professional footballer who played as a midfielder. He played for Ajax (1992–1995), Sevilla (1995–1998), Nagoya Grampus Eight (1998–2002), Sedan Ardennes (2002–2003), Consadole Sapporo (2003), and ADO Den Haag (2004).

Personal life
Born in Amsterdam, the Netherlands, Oulida is of Moroccan descent and holds both Dutch and Moroccan citizenship. Raised in Amsterdam-West near the Balboaplein, his parents are both from Casablanca, Morocco.

Career statistics

Honours
Ajax
Eredivisie: 1994–95, 1995–96
KNVB Cup: 1992–93
Dutch Supercup: 1995
UEFA Champions League: 1994–95

Sevilla
Trofeo Colombino: 1996

Nagoya Grampus Eight
Emperor's Cup: 1999

Individual
Ajax Talent of the Year (Marco van Basten Award): 1994

References

External links

 Profile 

1974 births
Living people
Dutch footballers
Dutch expatriate footballers
Association football midfielders
AFC Ajax players
Nagoya Grampus players
Sevilla FC players
CS Sedan Ardennes players
Hokkaido Consadole Sapporo players
Eredivisie players
La Liga players
Segunda División players
Ligue 1 players
Expatriate footballers in Spain
Expatriate footballers in France
Expatriate footballers in Japan
J1 League players
J2 League players
Footballers from Amsterdam
Dutch sportspeople of Moroccan descent
Dutch expatriate sportspeople in Japan
Dutch expatriate sportspeople in France
Dutch expatriate sportspeople in Spain